Production equipment control involves production equipment that resides in the shop floor of a manufacturing company and its purpose is to produce goods of a wanted quality when provided with production resources of a required quality. In modern production lines the production equipment is fully automated using industrial control methods and involves limited unskilled labour participation. Modern production equipment consists of mechatronic modules that are integrated according to a control architecture. The most widely known architectures involve hierarchy, polyarchy, hetaerarchy and hybrid. The methods for achieving a technical effect are described by control algorithms, which may or may not utilize formal methods in their design.

Industrial equipment
Formal methods